Leticia Siciliani  (born 18 July 1992) is an Argentine actress. She is best known for playing Nieves in the telenovela Esperanza mía (2015–2016) and Carmen in 100 días para enamorarse (2018).

Beginnings
From an early age, she took acting classes with Hugo Midón. She also took singing lessons and musical comedy classes.

Her first casting was for the successful juvenile series Patito feo, where she reached the final phase, but was not selected.

Acting career
Siciliani began her acting career in 2014, in the Pol-Ka series Mis amigos de siempre with the character of "Sol", a soccer player. In real life, Siciliani was a member of the Excursionistas Club.

In the same year she made her debut in theater with the play Amnesia.

In 2015, she made the leap to fame after playing Nieves in the series  Esperanza mía participating in the soundtrack and the theatrical version. This role gave her a Martín Fierro prize in the revelation category.

In 2016, she made her film debut the film El hilo rojo starring China Suárez, Benjamin Vicuña and Guillermina Valdez.

She currently takes part of the Argentine reality show Masterchef Celebrity.

Personal life
She is the younger sister of the actress Griselda Siciliani.

She lived with her partner Delfina Martínez, whom she met playing football. Siciliani proposed to her in 2017. They aren't together anymore.

Filmography

Film

Television

Theatre

Radio

Awards

References

External links
 

1992 births
Living people
20th-century Argentine LGBT people
21st-century Argentine actresses
21st-century Argentine LGBT people
Argentine telenovela actresses
Argentine lesbian actresses